Gynoxys leiotheca is a species of flowering plant in the family Asteraceae. It is found only in Ecuador. It is threatened by habitat loss.

References

leiotheca
Flora of Ecuador
Data deficient plants
Taxonomy articles created by Polbot